Benedict Saul McCarthy (born 12 November 1977) is a South African football coach and former player who is a first-team coach at Manchester United. He previously worked as head coach of South African Premier Division team AmaZulu.

A former forward, McCarthy is the South Africa national team's all-time top scorer with 31 goals. He is also the only South African to have won the UEFA Champions League, doing so with Porto in 2003–04.

Early life
McCarthy was born in Cape Town and grew up in Hanover Park in the Cape Flats, an area notorious for its high unemployment rate and gang violence. He is the son of Dudley and Dora McCarthy and has two brothers and a sister. His older brother is Jerome McCarthy, a former professional footballer who played for Kaizer Chiefs and Manning Rangers, among other clubs, while his younger brother Mark played football at Franklin Pierce University in the United States.

McCarthy began playing at a local side called Young Pirates, which was managed by his uncles. He then joined the youth structures of a local amateur club called Crusaders. At age 17, he was signed by first division club Seven Stars.

Club career

Seven Stars
Playing for Seven Stars, the 18-year-old McCarthy scored 1 goal in 29 matches in the 1995–96 season, followed by another 12 goals in 20 matches, which earned him a transfer to Cape Town Spurs, which two years later merged with Seven Stars to form Dutch club Ajax's feeder team, Ajax Cape Town.

Ajax
In 1997, after an impressive showing at the African Youth Championship and FIFA World Youth Championship in Malaysia, he joined Ajax in the Eredivisie, where he scored nine goals and was crowned champion in his first season. After a relatively successful 1998–99 season, he was sold to Spanish side Celta de Vigo for a transfer fee reported to be over €6 million, at the time the most expensive transfer for a South African player.

Celta Vigo
Although regarded as one of the best African players at the time, McCarthy never established himself as a regular choice for Celta's manager, Víctor Fernández. After two poor seasons at the Galician club, he was loaned to struggling Porto in the 2001–02 season, where he soon rediscovered the form that took him to Europe.

At Porto, McCarthy played under the then newly appointed coach José Mourinho for an underperforming team that since winning the European Cup in 1987 had never been quite good enough to challenge for the top honours in Europe. However, that would soon change.

After representing Bafana Bafana in the 2002 African Nations Cup, where his national side was eliminated in the quarter-finals, McCarthy returned to Porto, where he became the main force behind the team's recovery. He helped them to third place in the Primeira Liga and automatic qualification for the UEFA Cup by scoring an impressive 12 goals in 11 matches, but Porto's finances did not allow them to keep the player, despite the desire of both sides to continue.

In 2002–03, McCarthy therefore returned to Celta, where he spent much of his time on the substitutes' bench as a squad player as Porto captured the Taça de Portugal, the Portuguese League and the UEFA Cup. When Porto sold striker Hélder Postiga to Tottenham Hotspur ahead of the 2003–04 season, Porto finally acquired McCarthy for a sum of €7.856 million, (later re-sold part of the rights to GestiFute and First Portuguese Football Players Fund.)

Porto

For the 2003–04 Primeira Liga season, he earned the Golden Boot award (with 20 goals in 23 matches) on the season's final matchday with a hat-trick, and was instrumental in Porto's run in the 2003–04 UEFA Champions League, which they won. He scored two goals against Manchester United to defeat them in the second round.

Blackburn Rovers
On 25 July 2006, McCarthy flew out to England to undergo a medical and probable contract signing to join Blackburn Rovers. Three days later, he signed a four-year contract with Blackburn for a £2.5 million transfer fee. The move meant that Rovers regularly fielded a side that contained two South African Internationals, the other being Aaron Mokoena who joined the club the year previous. 

After a disappointing performance in the side's 3–0 defeat to Portsmouth, McCarthy found the net on his debut at Ewood Park against Everton on 23 August 2006. McCarthy further endeared himself to Rovers fans, scoring a goal on his European debut for the club in a 2–2 against Red Bull Salzburg in the UEFA Cup, and scoring another in the return leg. He finished second top scorer in the Premier League in 2006–07 with 18 league goals, as well as 24 in all competitions.

The following season got off to a poor start for McCarthy when he was stretchered off in the Premier League opening day win against Middlesbrough. McCarthy was out of action for a few weeks and found first team opportunities limited, largely because the form of new striking arrival Roque Santa Cruz. Despite being limited to largely substitute appearances, McCarthy did find the net 11 times in all competitions.

In the 2008–09 season, McCarthy appeared to be out of favour with new manager Paul Ince, as the club's strike force was strengthened with the arrivals of Carlos Villanueva and Robbie Fowler to join the already established Roque Santa Cruz, Jason Roberts and Matt Derbyshire. However, McCarthy answered these critics by scoring his first goal of the campaign – a 94th-minute equaliser in a Premier League match against Middlesbrough.

In all competitions for Blackburn, McCarthy scored 52 goals in 140 matches.

West Ham United
McCarthy completed a move to West Ham United for an undisclosed fee on transfer deadline day, 1 February 2010. He signed a two and a half-year contract that was due to run until the summer of 2012. He made his Premier League debut for West Ham against Burnley at Turf Moor in a 2–1 defeat on 6 February 2010, where he sustained an injury which would keep him out for six weeks. In February 2011, having played just 326 minutes of football, making only three starts and failing to score any goals for West Ham, McCarthy was omitted from West Ham's 25-man squad for the remainder of the 2010–11 season. He was also offered a £1 million pay-off in exchange for terminating his contract prematurely. In April 2011, McCarthy left West Ham by mutual agreement after the parties agreed to terminate his contract.
 He made only two Premier League starts and fourteen appearances in all competitions scoring no goals.

Orlando Pirates
After leaving West Ham, McCarthy trained with former club Ajax Cape Town during the ABSA Premier League off-season. On 2 August, Orlando Pirates confirmed the signing of McCarthy on a two-year deal, ending his 14-year spell in Europe. On signing, McCarthy said, "I'm thrilled and delighted and hope I can show my appreciation by coming in and playing good football and hope to score as many goals as possible to put the team where they belong."
 McCarthy began the season by scoring on debut and vowed to score more goals.

McCarthy scored two goals in the final half-hour to help the Pirates defeat the Golden Arrows 4–2 on 19 May 2012 to retain their Premier League title. He finished his successful season with ten league goals, ending the campaign as the fourth leading goal-scorer in the Premier League, helping the club secure their second successive treble. Having already won a league championship with Ajax in the Netherlands as well with Porto both domestically and in Europe, McCarthy would make football history by winning the league championship with Orlando Pirates in South Africa. This meant McCarthy was the first South African footballer to win three league titles with three different football clubs on two different continents.

McCarthy, who is affectionately known as "Big Brother" by the Orlando Pirates faithful, was handed a red card for dissent in the MTN 8 secondleg semi-final played on 25 August 2012 after he charged Franklin Cale after a reckless challenge on Daine Klate. This incident lead to protesting fans whom, in their view, Cale was equally guilty in the incident and should have also been shown red. McCarthy announced his retirement from professional football on 6 June 2013, aged 35.

Whitehill Welfare
On 13 July 2014, McCarthy made a guest appearance for Scottish Lowland league club Whitehill Welfare in a pre-season friendly against a Hamilton Academical XI, scoring in the 14th minute and providing an assist for Whitehill Welfare player Kerr Dodds to score in the 20th minute. McCarthy has a connection with the club through one of the Whitehill players, John Hall.

International career

McCarthy made his full international debut for South Africa in a friendly against the Netherlands on 4 June 1997.

Along with veteran Egyptian striker Hossam Hassan, McCarthy was the joint top scorer in the 1998 African Cup of Nations in Burkina Faso with seven goals, including four in 13 minutes against Namibia. In addition, he was named Player of the Tournament.

The 1998 FIFA World Cup in France was the first time South Africa's national football team had reached the later stages of the competition, and McCarthy was one of their key players. After a 3–0 defeat against eventual champions France, South Africa played their second match against Denmark. Trailing since the 13th minute, McCarthy tied the game at 1–1 in the 52nd minute and gave South Africa a chance for qualification after a 1–1 draw. However, the third match also ended in a draw, against Saudi Arabia, which left the South Africans in third place and eliminated from the competition.

The 2002 World Cup saw history repeating for the South Africans. After a 2–2 draw against Paraguay and a 1–0 victory over Slovenia, McCarthy's 30th-minute equaliser in the last match against Spain was not enough, as South Africa eventually lost 3–2 and finished with another third place in the group stage.

There was often conflict over McCarthy's lack of participation in national team matches (whose interests often collide with his club's) and he actually retired from international matches after the 2002 World Cup. However, he returned to the national team in 2004 and eventually set the record for most international goals for South Africa; McCarthy's strike in the second half of a 3–0 win against Paraguay in a 2008 friendly eclipsed the previous record of 29 goals held by Shaun Bartlett.

Prior to the 2010 World Cup, held in South Africa, McCarthy announced his support for the Gun-Free World Cup campaign being run by International Action Network on Small Arms. He said, "This World Cup will be the biggest in football history and the fact that it is taking place in South Africa is a chance for us to show the world everything that is good about our country. It's great that guns will be banned from stadiums – it's going to be a fantastic party, and guns have no place in that." After struggling with his fitness and facing criticism in his nation for being overweight, McCarthy was omitted from the final South African 23-man squad for the 2010 World Cup, which was announced on 1 June 2010.

Managerial and coaching career

Hibernian
Living in Edinburgh since 2013, McCarthy confirmed in April 2015, that he had joined the coaching staff of Alan Stubbs at Scottish club Hibernian. Stubbs had invited McCarthy so he could just learn the coaching side of things. McCarthy knew Stubbs back from their playing days when McCarthy was at Blackburn Rovers and Stubbs was at Everton. McCarthy said, that he was going to help out with the U20s, and assisting with the first team.

Sint-Truiden
In February 2015, he did a short internship at Sint-Truidense VV club under Yannick Ferrera. On 8 September 2015, McCarthy was appointed assistant manager to manager Chris O'Loughlin, who replaced Yannick Ferrera. Working his way through the different tiers of the UEFA Coaching Badges system, McCarthy met O'Loughlin.

On 20 April 2016, McCarthy stopped working with Sint-Truiden for personal reasons, after it was previously announced that his contract was not renewed.

Cape Town City
On 13 June 2017, McCarthy was unveiled as the new Cape Town City head coach, replacing Eric Tinkler, who moved to manage SuperSport United. 
McCarthy would complete his UEFA Pro License while coaching City, and would win his first silverware as a coach in 2018 when he guided City to the MTN 8 cup. 
On 4 November 2019, McCarthy was dismissed as head coach of Cape Town City after just two wins in 18 games .

AmaZulu
On 14 December 2020, McCarthy was unveiled as the new AmaZulu F.C. head coach, replacing Ayanda Dlamini, who stepped down from the position on 7 December 2020. He took the club to a second-place finish in the DStv Premiership, a record high for AmaZulu in the modern era of the game in South Africa. As a result, AmaZulu qualified for the preliminary rounds of the 2021–22 CAF Champions League. McCarthy led AmaZulu to the group stages of the 2021–22 CAF Champions League in their debut season before exiting the competition. McCarthy and AmaZulu parted company on 25 March 2022.

Manchester United

On 30 July 2022, McCarthy was appointed as a first-team coach at Manchester United.

Personal life
In 2004, McCarthy married Maria Santos from Spain. They have three daughters together: Minna, Mya and Allegra. In 2007, they separated. In May 2014, McCarthy married Scottish model Stacey Munro. Together, they have one daughter, Lima Rose and one son, Lio Romero, born in 2019.

Career statistics

Club

International
Scores and results list South Africa's goal tally first, score column indicates score after each McCarthy goal.

Managerial
As of 18 September 2021

Honours

Player 
Ajax
Eredivisie: 1997–98
KNVB Cup: 1997–98, 1998–99

Celta
UEFA Intertoto Cup: 2000

Porto
Primeira Liga: 2003–04, 2005–06
Taça de Portugal: 2005–06
Supertaça Cândido de Oliveira: 2003, 2004
UEFA Champions League: 2003–04
Intercontinental Cup: 2004

Orlando Pirates
Premier League: 2011–12
MTN 8: 2011
Telkom Knockout: 2011
South Africa

 African Cup of Nations runner-up: 1998
 Reunification Cup: 2002
Individual
African Cup of Nations Best Player: 1998
African Cup of Nations Top Scorer: 1998
African Cup of Nations Team of the Tournament: 1998
African Goal of the Year: 2004
Ajax Talent of the Year (Marco van Basten Award): 1997–98
SJPF Player of the Month: January 2004, May 2004, October 2004
Primeira Liga Top Scorer: 2003–04
Taça de Portugal Top Scorer: 2005–06

Manager 
Cape Town City
MTN 8: 2018

In popular culture
In 1998, McCarthy collaborated with South African kwaito music group TKZee in "Shibobo". The song released in the run-up to the 1998 World Cup in France samples greatly on "The Final Countdown" by Europe and features McCarthy rapping part of the lyrics. He also appears in the football-themed music video for the song. Sales of the single topped the 100,000 mark in just over a month in South Africa, making "Shibobo" the fastest and biggest selling CD single by TKZee or other South African recording artists. The song was also a hit in other African music charts. The song enjoyed a comeback in a re-release in 2010–11.

Discography

Singles
1998: "Shibobo" by TKZee featuring Benni McCarthy

References

External links
 
 Premier League profile

1977 births
Living people
South African soccer players
Association football forwards
AFC Ajax players
RC Celta de Vigo players
FC Porto players
Blackburn Rovers F.C. players
West Ham United F.C. players
National First Division players
South African Premier Division players
Eredivisie players
La Liga players
Primeira Liga players
Premier League players
South Africa international soccer players
1998 FIFA World Cup players
Footballers at the 2000 Summer Olympics
Olympic soccer players of South Africa
2002 FIFA World Cup players
1998 African Cup of Nations players
2002 African Cup of Nations players
2006 Africa Cup of Nations players
South African expatriate soccer players
South African expatriate sportspeople in the Netherlands
Expatriate footballers in the Netherlands
South African expatriate sportspeople in Spain
Expatriate footballers in Spain
South African expatriate sportspeople in Portugal
Expatriate footballers in Portugal
Expatriate footballers in England
Cape Coloureds
Orlando Pirates F.C. players
UEFA Champions League winning players
Cape Town City F.C. (2016) managers
South African soccer managers
Association football coaches
Soccer players from Cape Town
Manchester United F.C. non-playing staff